Thomas Larsson (born January 16, 1988, in Skellefteå) is a Swedish ice hockey player. Thomas Larsson played in two leagues over the course of his career. He is currently playing with the Malmö Redhawks in the Swedish HockeyAllsvenskan. He has formerly played for Skellefteå AIK.

References

External links

1988 births
Living people
Skellefteå AIK players
Swedish ice hockey centres
People from Skellefteå Municipality
Sportspeople from Västerbotten County